Paulatuk Water Aerodrome  is located in the Parry Peninsula's Darnley Bay near Paulatuk, Northwest Territories, Canada. It is open from July until October.

See also
Paulatuk Airport

References

Airports in the Arctic
Registered aerodromes in the Inuvik Region
Seaplane bases in the Northwest Territories